Joshua Fisher may refer to:

Joshua Fisher (merchant) (1707–1783), Philadelphia merchant
Joshua Fisher, owner of the Beverly Cotton Manufactory
Joshua Fisher (musician) (born 1989),  English singer-songwriter
Joshua Fisher (Massachusetts politician) (died 1672), colonial Massachusetts politician
Joshua Fisher (born 1675) (1675–1730), colonial Massachusetts politician
Joshua Francis Fisher, American author and philanthropist